Andrzej Zbigniew Butra (8 October 1961 – 30 March 2022) was a Polish veterinarian and politician. A member of the Polish People's Party, he served as Deputy Minister of Agriculture and Rural Development from 2011 to 2012. He died on 30 March 2022, at the age of 60.

References

1961 births
2022 deaths
Polish veterinarians
Polish politicians
Polish civil servants
Polish People's Party politicians
Local politicians in Poland